Alexander Nicholson (14 January 1897 – 29 June 1972) was an Australian rules footballer who played for the South Melbourne Football Club in the Victorian Football League (VFL).

Notes

External links 

1897 births
1972 deaths
Australian rules footballers from Victoria (Australia)
Sydney Swans players